Octávio Joaquim Coelho Machado (born 6 May 1949) is a retired Portuguese football defensive midfielder and coach.

Club career
Born in Palmela, Setúbal District, Machado was a leading player for Vitória de Setúbal and FC Porto during the 1970s, winning two Primeira Liga titles with the latter even though he missed the entire 1978–79 due to injury. Over the course of 15 top division seasons, he amassed totals of 307 games and 25 goals; with the latter side, he was also involved in an internal dispute which resulted in the departure of 15 players, along with manager José Maria Pedroto and director of football Jorge Nuno Pinto da Costa.

After retiring at the age of 35 with his first club, Machado went on to become an assistant manager to Artur Jorge, joining his Porto staff in the 1984–85 campaign. There, he won two leagues in a row and the 1987 European Cup, remaining alongside Jorge into the 1990s when he finally became a head coach, managing both Porto and Sporting Clube de Portugal.

International career
Machado earned 19 caps for the Portugal national team, scoring once. His first appearance was on 21 November 1971, a 1–1 against Belgium for the UEFA Euro 1972 qualifiers.

Machado's last international was against Poland on 29 October 1977 in the 1978 FIFA World Cup qualifying campaign, a 1–1 draw.

|}

Post-retirement
After his long experience in professional football, Machado started a private business activity in agriculture, and was involved in local politics in his hometown of Palmela.

Honours

Player
Primeira Liga: 1977–78, 1978–79
Taça de Portugal: 1976–77; Runner-up 1972–73, 1977–78, 1979–80

Manager
Supertaça Cândido de Oliveira: 1995, 2001
Taça de Portugal: Runner-up 1995–96

References

External links

1949 births
Living people
Sportspeople from Setúbal District
Portuguese footballers
Association football midfielders
Primeira Liga players
Vitória F.C. players
FC Porto players
Portugal international footballers
Portuguese football managers
Primeira Liga managers
Sporting CP managers
FC Porto managers